Katerina Kotsonis is an Australian stage actress known for her role as Mrs Papasavas in the children's television series Short Cuts and Patricia Pappas in Neighbours.

Career

Stage
Most recently Kotsonis has been performing on stage in Cruel and Tender (Melbourne Theatre Company), Born Yesterday (MTC), The White Rose (Midsummer Festival) and Forty Lounge Café (La Mama).

Filmography
Kotsonis has appeared the series Very Small Business, and in television shows Blue Heelers, The Secret Life of Us, Wildside, Embassy, and Acropolis Now, as well as in the film Head On.

Wentworth Sarah Collins (2015), Brenda Murphy (2016–2018, 2020)
Neighbours (2012–2015)
Very Small Business (2 episodes, 2008) (TV)
Short Cuts (7 episodes, 2002) (TV)
MDA  (2002) (TV)
Blue Heelers  (2 episodes, 2001–2002) (TV)
The Secret Life of Us  (2001) (TV)
Wildside (1999) (TV)
The Games (Australian TV series) (1998) (TV)
Head On (1998) .... Ariadne 
Embassy (1991) (TV)
Acropolis Now (1989) (TV)

References

External links

Living people
Australian film actresses
Australian stage actresses
Australian television actresses
Australian people of Greek descent
20th-century Australian actresses
21st-century Australian actresses
Year of birth missing (living people)